Ramesh Sinha (born 5 September 1964) is an Indian Judge. Presently, he is a Judge of Allahabad High Court from 2011.

Career 
He was graduated in law from Allahabad University in 1990 and enrolled as an Advocate on 8 September 1990. He practiced in civil and criminal side at Allahabad High Court. He was elevated as an Additional Judge of Allahabad High Court on 21 November 2011 and was made permanent on 6 August 2013.

References 

Indian judges
1964 births
Living people
Judges of the Allahabad High Court
University of Allahabad alumni